Wolverton is a surname. Notable people with the surname include:
Andrew Wolverton, American soccer player
Basil Wolverton, artist
Bill Wolverton, scientist
Charles A. Wolverton, U.S. congressman
Charles E. Wolverton, Oregon Supreme Court Chief Justice
Dave Wolverton (1957–2022), author
Harry Wolverton, baseball player
John M. Wolverton, American politician
Karin Wolverton, American operatic soprano
Monte Wolverton, American editorial cartoonist
Robert Lee Wolverton, US Army colonel
Sharnael Wolverton, American author, minister, and television host
Simon Peter Wolverton, American politician
Troy Wolverton, American journalist

See also
Baron Wolverton, a British noble title held by the Glyn family